Nicholson Island is an island of the Andaman Islands. It belongs to the South Andaman administrative district, part of the Indian union territory of Andaman and Nicobar Islands.

Etymology
Nicholson is named after Brigadier general John Nicholson (East India Company officer).

Geography
The island belongs to the Ritchie's Archipelago and is located between Peel Island and Sir John Lawrence's Brother: Henry Lawrence Island.
the waters surrounding Wall Point in the south of the island is a major tourist diving spot.

Administration
Politically, Nicholson Island is part of Port Blair Taluk.

Demographics 
The island is uninhabited.

Image gallery

References 

Ritchie's Archipelago
Uninhabited islands of India
Islands of South Andaman district
Islands of the Andaman Sea
Islands of India
Islands of the Bay of Bengal